Orphnophanes is a genus of moths of the family Crambidae described by Julius Lederer in 1863.

Species
Orphnophanes ankarampotsyalis Marion & Viette, 1956
Orphnophanes eucerusalis (Walker, 1859)
Orphnophanes laevalis (Warren, 1896)
Orphnophanes thoasalis (Walker, 1859)
Orphnophanes turbatalis Christoph, 1881

References

Spilomelinae
Crambidae genera
Taxa named by Julius Lederer